The M-K TE70-4S was a four-axle  B-B diesel-electric locomotive built by Morrison-Knudsen. The locomotive was a rebuild of the GE U25B with a Sulzer V-12 prime mover installed. Morrison-Knudsen rebuilt four for the Southern Pacific Railroad in 1978. The experiment proved unsuccessful and no additional units were rebuilt.

Design 
The prime mover for the M-K TE70-4S was a Sulzer 12ASV 25/30. Normally found in marine or stationary uses, the 12ASV 25/30 had been in production since 1969. The locomotives retained the GE GT598 D3A generators and GE 752 traction motors from the U25B.

The new prime mover required substantial alterations to the cab, carbody, and underframe.

History 
Southern Pacific sent four GE U25Bs ( 7030–7033), then at the end of their service life, to Morrison-Knudsen for rebuilding. Morrison-Knudsen rebuilt the four locomotives in its Boise, Idaho, shops in 1977–1978. The first revenue run occurred beginning March 1, 1978, when the four locomotives handled a Seattle–Los Angeles trailer-on-flatcar (TOFC) train between Portland and Los Angeles. Inauspiciously, one of the four locomotives broke down during the trip.

The locomotives carried a unique paint scheme featuring the red-and-orange of the SP's famed "Daylight" passenger trains, albeit in a different style. The color scheme led to the nickname "Popsicle". Due to their consistent unreliability, all four were retired in 1987 after less than ten years; none were preserved.

Notes

References

Further reading

External links 
 Southern Pacific TE70-4S on My Espee Modelers Archive

TE70-4S
B-B locomotives
Diesel-electric locomotives of the United States
Railway locomotives introduced in 1978
Freight locomotives
Standard gauge locomotives of the United States